The Gulf Cooperation Council Athletics Championship (also known as the GCC Athletics Championships) is a biennial international athletics competition between athletes from nations within the Cooperation Council for the Arab States of the Gulf. It was first held in 1986.

In addition to the senior championship, the GCC also holds the Gulf Cooperation Council Youth Athletics Championships. The GCC holds championships for various other sports, including golf, basketball and fencing.

The 2011 championships was held as part of the 2011 GCC Games.

Editions

Champions

100 metres
1986: 
1988: 
1992: 
1994: 
1996: 
1998: 
2000: 
2002: 
2003: 
2005:

200 metres
1986: 
1988: 
1992: 
1994: 
1996: 
1998: 
2000: 
2002: 
2003: 
2005:

400 metres
1986: 
1988: 
1992: 
1994: 
1996: 
1998: 
2000: 
2002: 
2003: 
2005:

800 metres
1986: 
1988: 
1992: 
1994: 
1996: 
1998: 
2000: 
2002: 
2003: 
2005:

1500 metres
1986: 
1988: 
1992: 
1994: 
1996: 
1998: 
2000: 
2002: 
2003: 
2005:

5000 metres
1986: 
1988: 
1992: 
1994: 
1996: 
1998: 
2000: 
2002: 
2003: 
2005:

10,000 metres
1986: 
1988: 
1992: 
1994: 
1996: 
1998: 
2000: 
2002: 
2003: 
2005:

Marathon
1986:

Half marathon
1992: 
1994: 
1996: 
1998: 
2000: 
2002: 
2003: 
2005:

3000 metres steeplechase
1986: 
1988: 
1992: 
1994: 
1996: 
1998: 
2000: 
2002: 
2003: 
2005:

110 metres hurdles
1986: 
1988: 
1992: 
1994: 
1996: 
1998: 
2000: 
2002: 
2003: 
2005:

400 metres hurdles
1986: 
1988: 
1992: 
1994: 
1996: 
1998: 
2000: 
2002: 
2003: 
2005:

High jump
1986: 
1988: 
1992: 
1994: 
1996: 
1998: 
2000: 
2002: 
2003: 
2005:

Pole vault
1986: 
1988: 
1992: 
1994: 
1996: 
1998: 
2000: 
2002: 
2003: 
2005:

Long jump
1986: 
1988: 
1992: 
1994: 
1996: 
1998: 
2000: 
2002: 
2003: 
2005:

Triple jump
1986: 
1988: 
1992: 
1994: 
1996: 
1998: 
2000: 
2002: 
2003: 
2005:

Shot put
1986: 
1988: 
1992: 
1994: 
1996: 
1998: 
2000: 
2002: 
2003: 
2005:

Discus throw
1986: 
1988: 
1992: 
1994: 
1996: 
1998: 
2000: 
2002: 
2003: 
2005:

Hammer throw
1986: 
1988: 
1992: 
1994: 
1996: 
1998: 
2000: 
2002: 
2003: 
2005:

Javelin throw
1986: 
1988: 
1992: 
1994: 
1996: 
1998: 
2000: 
2002: 
2003: 
2005:

Decathlon
1986: 
1988: 
1992: 
1994: 
1996: 
1998: 
2000: 
2002: 
2003: 
2005:

20 km walk
1986:

10,000 metres walk
1994: 
1996: Not held
1998: 
2000: 
2002: 
2003: 
2005:

4 × 100 metres relay
1986: 
1988: 
1992: 
1994: 
1996: 
1998: 
2000: 
2002: 
2003: 
2005:

4 × 400 metres relay
1986: 
1988: 
1992: 
1994: 
1996: 
1998: 
2000: 
2002: 
2003: 
2005:

See also
GCC Champions League, a regional football competition for Gulf states

References

Athletics competitions in Asia
Gulf Cooperation Council
Sport in the Middle East
Athletics
Recurring sporting events established in 1986
Men's athletics competitions
Biennial athletics competitions
1986 establishments in Asia